Tony Kearney is a Scottish actor and TV presenter. He is best known for playing Scott Wallace in the BBC Scotland soap opera, River City. He previously appeared for six years in Machair, a Scottish Gaelic soap. He narrated the Gaelic version of Meeow!.

Early life
Kearney was born in Stirling and studied an arts degree at the University of Glasgow.

Career
Kearney presented Blasad, a 2010 series on BBC Alba where he speaks with guests about food. Kearney stars in Turas Tony, a 2011 BBC Alba series on where he takes on a number of challenges. These include running a hotel, joining a mountain rescue team, and working as a chef in a restaurant. He has also appeared on Taggart and Wheel of Fortune.

In 2011, Kearney acted in Somersaults, a play written by Iain Finlay Macleod for the National Theatre of Scotland.

In August 2019 he provided commentary for the Scottish broadcast of the Eurovision Choir 2019 contest.

Radio

References

External links

Year of birth missing (living people)
Scottish male soap opera actors
Scottish television presenters
People from Barra
Living people